Hironari (written: 洋成, 弘成, 弘就 or 弘也) is a masculine Japanese given name. Notable people with the name include:

, Japanese samurai and daimyō
, Japanese footballer
, Japanese particle and nuclear physicist
, Japanese comedian

Japanese masculine given names